Michael Francis Plant (14 September 1900 – 8 September 1976) was an Australian rules footballer who played with Collingwood in the Victorian Football League (VFL) and Coburg in the Victorian Football Association.

Plant was a key forward for Coburg during the club's dominant era in the late 1920s. Plant played for Coburg from 1924 until 1931, playing a total of 93 games and kicking 354 goals. He finished as the VFA's leading goalkicker in 1928 with 78 goals, as well as finishing third in the association with tallies of 81 goals in 1927 and 74 goals in 1929, and was a member of Coburg's 1926, 1927 and 1928 premiership teams. He was inducted into the club's hall of fame in 2017.

Notes

External links 

Frank Plant's profile at Collingwood Forever

1900 births
1976 deaths
Australian rules footballers from Victoria (Australia)
Collingwood Football Club players
Coburg Football Club players